Talbi is a surname. Notable people with the surname include:

Ahmed Talbi (born 1981), Moroccan footballer
Alaa Talbi (born 1978), Tunisian Civil Society and Human Rights activist
Mohamed Talbi (1921–2017), Tunisian historian and professor
Rachamim Talbi (born 1943), Israeli football
Rachid Talbi Alami (born 1958), Moroccan politician

See also
Mozaffar-e Talbi, is a village in Qeshlaq-e Sharqi Rural District, Qeshlaq Dasht District, Bileh Savar County, Ardabil Province, Iran
Qeshlaq-e Qarqoli Rahim Talbi, is a village in Qeshlaq-e Sharqi Rural District, Qeshlaq Dasht District, Bileh Savar County, Ardabil Province, Iran

References